Blackburn is an unincorporated community in Lee's Creek Township, Washington County, Arkansas, United States. It is located on Arkansas Highway 74, northeast of Devil's Den State Park.

A post office called Blackburn was established in 1880, and remained in operation until 1952.

References

Unincorporated communities in Washington County, Arkansas
Unincorporated communities in Arkansas
1880 establishments in Arkansas